Punctoterebra succincta is a species of sea snail, a marine gastropod mollusk in the family Terebridae, the auger snails.

Description

Distribution

References

External links
 Röding, P. F. (1798). Museum Boltenianum sive Catalogus cimeliorum e tribus regnis naturæ quæ olim collegerat Joa. Fried Bolten, M. D. p. d. per XL. annos proto physicus Hamburgensis. Pars secunda continens Conchylia sive Testacea univalvia, bivalvia & multivalvia. Trapp, Hamburg. viii, 199 pp.
 Quoy J.R.C. & Gaimard J.P. (1832–1835). Voyage de découvertes de l'"Astrolabe" exécuté par ordre du Roi, pendant les années 1826–1829, sous le commandement de M. J. Dumont d'Urville. Zoologie. 1: i–l, 1–264; 2(1): 1–321 [1832]; 2(2): 321–686 [1833]; 3(1): 1–366 [1834]; 3(2): 367–954 [1835]; Atlas (Mollusques): pls 1–93 [1833]. Paris: Tastu
 Gmelin J.F. (1791). Vermes. In: Gmelin J.F. (Ed.) Caroli a Linnaei Systema Naturae per Regna Tria Naturae, Ed. 13. Tome 1(6). G.E. Beer, Lipsiae
 Deshayes, G. P. (1859). A general review of the genus Terebra, and a description of new species. Proceedings of the Zoological Society of London. (1859) 27: 270-321.
 Fedosov, A. E.; Malcolm, G.; Terryn, Y.; Gorson, J.; Modica, M. V.; Holford, M.; Puillandre, N. (2020). Phylogenetic classification of the family Terebridae (Neogastropoda: Conoidea). Journal of Molluscan Studies

Terebridae
Gastropods described in 1791
Taxa named by Johann Friedrich Gmelin